Door on the Left as You Leave the Elevator is a 1988 French comedy written by Gérard Lauzier (based on his play), directed by Édouard Molinaro, and starring Pierre Richard, Emmanuelle Béart, and Richard Bohringer.

Plot
The plot is based around a successful, yet very shy painter Yann (Pierre Richard) who is in love with a married woman Florence (Fanny Cottençon). When he finally manages to have a date with her in his apartment, he has to face big problems. His neighbour Boris, another painter (and an artist maudit) who is extremely insecure and possessive towards his young wife Éva, leaves his flat without his suitcase, and when Éva, dressed only in lingerie, runs out of the door to let him know, a draft of air closes her door and she has to ask Yann for help. Unfortunately, that is just the moment when both Boris and Florence turn up. The story gets even more complicated as Florence's husband also comes to Yann's flat, and when Yann, when joking, mistakes a toy gun for a real one, and lightly injures Boris. But eventually all comes to a happy end.

Cast 

 Pierre Richard: Yann Ducoudray
 Emmanuelle Béart: Eva
 Richard Bohringer: Boris
 Fanny Cottençon: Florence Arnaud
 Pierre Vernier: Paul Arnaud
 Jean-Michel Dupuis: Jean-Yves
 Michel Creton: first policeman
 Éric Blanc: second policeman
 Édouard Molinaro: man by the elevator

External links 
 
 Gallery of stills

1980s French-language films
Films directed by Édouard Molinaro
1988 comedy films
1988 films
French comedy films
Films set in Paris
French films based on plays
Films produced by Claude Berri
1980s French films